Murchison Falls, also known as Kabalega Falls, is a waterfall at the apex of Lake Albert on the Victoria Nile in Uganda.

Some historians believe that a party of Roman legionaries dispatched by Nero may have reached the Murchison Falls in 61 AD, but there is major controversy about the feasibility of what would have been a very difficult achievement.

Samuel Baker and Florence Baker were the first Europeans who definitely sighted them. Baker named them after Roderick Murchison, the President of the Royal Geographical Society. The falls lend their name to the surrounding Murchison Falls National Park.

During the regime of Idi Amin in the 1970s, the name was changed to Kabalega Falls, after the Omukama (King) Kabalega of Bunyoro, although this was never legally promulgated. The name reverted to Murchison Falls following the downfall of Amin. It is still sometimes referred to as Kabalega Falls.

Ernest Hemingway crashed a plane just downriver from Murchison Falls in 1954. In August 2019, Uganda rejected a hydropower project by South Africa’s Bonang Power and Energy in order to preserve the Falls, one of the country's most lucrative tourism sites.

See also
 List of waterfalls by flow rate
 Murchison Falls National Park
 Paraa

References

External links

Waterfalls of Uganda
Nile